Geovanny  Polanco (born 2 November 1974; also spelled Yovanny, Jhovanny, Yhovanny, Yovanny, or Jovanny) is a Dominican merengue singer from María Trinidad Sánchez Province, Nagua, Dominican Republic.

References

1974 births
Living people
Dominican Republic musicians
Merengue musicians
21st-century accordionists